Massimiliano Busellato (born 23 April 1993) is an Italian footballer who plays as a midfielder for  club Padova.

Club career
A Cittadella youth product, Busellato made his first-team debut on 15 October 2011, starting in a 2–0 home success over Grosseto. On 14 January of the following year he scored his first professional goal, netting his side's only of a 1–1 draw at AlbinoLeffe.

On 13 August 2015 Busellato was signed by Ternana in a temporary deal.

On 4 August 2018 he signed with Serie B club Foggia.

On 19 July 2019, Busellato signed to Pescara for free. He left the club at the end of the season.

On 1 September 2021, he joined to Padova.

References

External links
FIGC International stats  

1993 births
Living people
People from Bassano del Grappa
Sportspeople from the Province of Vicenza
Italian footballers
Association football midfielders
Serie B players
Serie C players
A.S. Cittadella players
Ternana Calcio players
U.S. Salernitana 1919 players
S.S.C. Bari players
Calcio Foggia 1920 players
Delfino Pescara 1936 players
Calcio Padova players
Italy youth international footballers
Italy under-21 international footballers
Footballers from Veneto